Terremoto is a traditional Chilean cocktail created at the end of the 20th century. It can be recognized as a derivative of punch to the Roman style. The name, which literally means earthquake, is due to the fact that it was invented after the 1985 earthquake in Chile. Although its origin is not confirmed and many claim its creation, this drink has been widely popularized in Chilean popular culture by the bars La Piojera, Rincón de los canallas, and El Hoyo.

The drink is mainly made up of white Pipeño wine or non-denominated white wine (generic wine of any strain), pineapple ice cream and grenadine. In its traditional presentation (a 400 ml glass approximately) it has the name terremoto (earthquake). A half-size terremoto served after the first is sometimes referred to as an aftershock. The large jug is popularly known as Cataclismo, the small glass repetition is known as Réplica and the small glass before (or if it is the only one) is known as Temblor, the version with red wine is known as Africano or Terremoto Africano.

History
Wines sweetened with some addition go through a long historical tradition, originating in colonial Chile, where the sunny ones of Cauquenes and Pajaretes del Huasco and Elqui are visible to this day. Some of these already sweet wines were incorporated with "meringue" or egg frosting. In 1930 the American documentary Travel Talks is filmed, where it is observed how part of the Chilean upper class, consumed wines incorporating some food or sweet addition as an accompaniment, such as "champagne" with seasonal fruits. Already in the mid-sixties and seventies, the punch with added fruit and pineapple ice cream became popular in some bars on Paseo Ahumada and Calle Santo Domingo. Being recognizable in Chile from 1970 to the present, the seasonal custom and in end-of-year celebrations, incorporate pineapple ice cream to some wine with the presence of carbon dioxide. At the same time, in the eighties, red wine with condensed milk became popular in some bars outside the historic center of Santiago.

The La Piojera bar in downtown Santiago was, according to its tenant, recognized for serving this drink since before 1985 [appointment required]. In this restaurant, the Replica is also served, which consists of a portion similar to the previous glass, but you can also choose to take one of the well-known Tsunamis or Tidal waves that are prepared based on a mixture of beer, wine, pisco and ice.

The best-known version of the origin of the name of this drink refers to the El Hoyo bar-restaurant, located in the commune of Estación Central. According to his tenant, German reporters came to cover the 1985 earthquake in Chile, they quickly drank the drink and, feeling one of them dizzy when standing up, exclaimed: "This really is an earthquake!".

References

Cocktails with wine
Cocktails with grenadine
Chilean drinks